The 1984 Stanley Cup playoffs, the playoff tournament of the National Hockey League (NHL) began on April 4, after the conclusion of the 1983–84 NHL season. The playoffs concluded on May 19 with the Edmonton Oilers defeating the four time defending champion New York Islanders 5–2 to win the Stanley Cup Finals four games to one, the franchise's first Stanley Cup.

Playoff seeds
The 1984 playoffs largely maintained the format used for the previous two seasons. The four teams with the best regular-season records from each of the four divisions secured playoff berths. The division semi-finals saw the first-place club against the fourth-place team, while the other two teams played against each other. The winning clubs then met in the division final. Home-ice advantage for these first two rounds of the playoffs were granted to the team with the better regular-season record. Division winners then met one another in the conference finals.

Leaving behind the coin flip system introduced for the 1982 playoffs, the NHL changed the method by which home-ice advantage is determined for the final two rounds. The higher point total accumulated by teams within a division from contests against teams of the other division in the conference, secured home-ice advantage for the corresponding division champion. Similarly, the higher point total accumulated by teams within a conference from contests against teams of the other conference, secured home-ice advantage for the corresponding conference champion.

This formula resulted in home-ice advantage for the Adams and Smythe division champions in the conference finals and resulted in home-ice advantage for the Wales Conference champion in the Stanley Cup finals.

The sequence of Stanley Cup Finals games was changed for this season. The series opened with two games at the venue of the team with home-ice advantage and then shifted to the opponent's rink for the next three games, including the fifth (if necessary). The series then returned to the initial venue for the final two games (if necessary).

The following teams qualified for the playoffs:

Prince of Wales Conference

Adams Division
 Boston Bruins, Adams Division champions – 104 points (49 wins)
 Buffalo Sabres – 103 points
 Quebec Nordiques – 94 points
 Montreal Canadiens – 75 points

Patrick Division
 New York Islanders, Patrick Division champions, Prince of Wales Conference regular season champions – 104 points (50 wins)
 Washington Capitals – 101 points
 Philadelphia Flyers – 98 points
 New York Rangers – 93 points

Clarence Campbell Conference

Norris Division
 Minnesota North Stars, Norris Division champions – 88 points
 St. Louis Blues – 71 points
 Detroit Red Wings – 69 points
 Chicago Black Hawks – 68 points

Smythe Division
 Edmonton Oilers, Smythe Division champions, Clarence Campbell Conference regular season champions – 119 points
 Calgary Flames – 82 points
 Vancouver Canucks – 73 points (32 wins)
 Winnipeg Jets – 73 points (31 wins)

Playoff bracket

Division Semifinals

Prince of Wales Conference

(A1) Boston Bruins vs. (A4) Montreal Canadiens

This was the 19th playoff series between these two teams. Montreal lead 16–2 in previous playoff meetings. Montreal won the most recent meeting in seven games in the 1979 Stanley Cup Semifinals.

(A2) Buffalo Sabres vs. (A3) Quebec Nordiques

This was the first playoff series meeting between these two teams.

(P1) New York Islanders vs. (P4) New York Rangers

This was the sixth playoff series meeting between these two teams. The Islanders won four of the previous five meetings, including in each of the past three seasons. The Islanders won in six games in last year's Patrick Division Finals.

(P2) Washington Capitals vs. (P3) Philadelphia Flyers

This was the first playoff series meeting between these two teams.

Clarence Campbell Conference

(N1) Minnesota North Stars vs. (N4) Chicago Black Hawks

This was the third playoff series meeting between these two teams. Chicago won both previous meetings over the past two seasons, including last year's Norris Division Finals in five games.

(N2) St. Louis Blues vs. (N3) Detroit Red Wings

This was the first playoff series meeting between these two teams.

(S1) Edmonton Oilers vs. (S4) Winnipeg Jets

This was the second playoff series meeting between these two teams. This was a rematch of last year's Smythe Division Semifinals, in which Edmonton won in a three-game sweep.

(S2) Calgary Flames vs. (S3) Vancouver Canucks

This was the third playoff series meeting between these two teams. Both teams split their prior two meetings in the past two seasons. Calgary won last year's Smythe Division Semifinals 3–1.

Division Finals

Prince of Wales Conference

(A3) Quebec Nordiques vs. (A4) Montreal Canadiens

This was the second playoff series meeting between these two teams. Quebec won the only previous meeting 3–2 in the 1982 Adams Division Semifinals.

Game six of this series is referred to as the Good Friday Massacre.

(P1) New York Islanders vs. (P2) Washington Capitals

This was the second playoff series meeting between these two teams. This was a rematch of last year's Patrick Division Semifinals, in which New York won 3–1. By winning their eighteenth consecutive series, the Islanders set a North American major professional sports record for most consecutive playoff series victories (previously set by the Boston Celtics with seventeen series wins over eight years in the 1950's and 1960's).

Clarence Campbell Conference

(N1) Minnesota North Stars vs. (N2) St. Louis Blues

This was the fifth playoff series meeting between these two teams. St. Louis won three of the previous four meetings, including their most recent in the 1972 Stanley Cup Quarterfinals in seven games.

(S1) Edmonton Oilers vs. (S2) Calgary Flames

This was the second playoff series meeting between these two teams. This was a rematch of last year's Smythe Division Finals, in which Edmonton won in five games.

Lanny McDonald scored the overtime winner for Calgary in Game 6.

Conference Finals

Prince of Wales Conference Final

(P1) New York Islanders vs. (A4) Montreal Canadiens

This was the third playoff series meeting between these two teams. Montreal won both prior meetings, including the most recent meeting in six games in the 1977 Stanley Cup Semifinals.

Clarence Campbell Conference Final

(S1) Edmonton Oilers vs. (N1) Minnesota North Stars

This was the first playoff series meeting between these two teams.

Stanley Cup Finals 

This was the third playoff series meeting between these two teams. New York won both previous meetings, and was a rematch of New York's four-game sweep in last year's Stanley Cup Finals.

The Islanders attempted to match the 1950s Montreal Canadiens and win the Stanley Cup five consecutive times, against the Edmonton Oilers attempting to win the franchise's first championship. The Islanders lost the first game at home 1–0, but bounced back to defeat the Oilers 6–1 in the second game. Edmonton took over the series from that point, winning the next three games, all played in Edmonton.

Player statistics

Skaters
These are the top ten skaters based on points.

Goaltenders
This is a combined table of the top five goaltenders based on goals against average and the top five goaltenders based on save percentage, with at least 420 minutes played. The table is sorted by GAA, and the criteria for inclusion are bolded.

See also
1983–84 NHL season
List of NHL seasons
List of Stanley Cup champions

References

 

playoffs
Stanley Cup playoffs